Wolk is a surname, and may refer to:
 Andy Wolk, an American television and theatre director
 Arthur Alan Wolk (1943−), an American attorney and author
Donna Wolk, American microbiologist
 Douglas Wolk, an American author and critic
 Emil Wolk (1944−), an Anglo-American stage director and stage and screen actor
 James Wolk (1985−), an American actor
 Lois Wolk, an American politician
 Steven Wolk, chief technology officer
 Tom "T-Bone" Wolk, a bass guitarist
 William Wolk (1951−) an American painter

See also
 
Wolke (disambiguation)
Wölk
Surnames from given names